Military Courts of Vietnam deal with criminal matters within the Vietnam People's Army. They are part of the court system in Vietnam:

 Supreme People's Court of Vietnam
 Local Courts of Vietnam
 Provincial Municipal Courts of Vietnam

Military courts operate at various levels in the VPA, with the highest being the Central Military Tribunal, an affiliated institution which is subordinate to the People's Court.

References

External links
Law enforcement in Vietnam

Judiciary of Vietnam
Vietnam
Military of Vietnam